Scotland County is the name of two counties in the United States:

 Scotland County, Missouri
 Scotland County, North Carolina